John Sassamon, also known as Wussausmon, was a Massachusett man who lived in New England during the colonial era. He converted to Christianity and became a praying Indian, helping to serve as an interpreter to New England colonists. In January 1675, Sassamon was ambushed and assassinated. A mixed jury of colonists and Indian elders convicted and executed three Wampanoag men for his murder. These events helped spark the conflict known as King Philip's War, in which the New England Colonies defeated the Wampanoag and ended armed resistance by the Native Americans of southeastern New England.

Early life and education
John Sassamon was a member of the Massachusett tribe, born at the Massachuset, Punkapoag Plantation to Punkapoag parents. Historians believe that he was then raised in the home of Richard Callicot, where he may have been indentured along with the Indian translator Cockenoe. By his early teen years, he had been introduced to Christianity and learned to speak English. He is believed to have met and been mentored by the Christian missionary John Eliot during this period, and may have known and worked with him for as long as 40 years. Eliot mentioned the death of Sassamon in his diary.

By the Pequot War in 1637, a joint effort by colonists and Native American allies to suppress the Pequot in present-day Connecticut, Sassamon was skilled enough with the English language to serve as an interpreter for the colonists. He fought with them alongside Callicot in the service of Captain John Underhill. Following the war, Sassamon began to teach Eliot the Indian language in exchange for learning English and the Christian way of life. In 1651, Eliot established Natick as the first praying town. Praying towns were reserved for Native Americans who had converted to Christianity and were willing to live according to European-style customs in permanent agricultural settlements. Eliot recruited Sassamon as one of two schoolmasters to teach both English and Christianity to the residents.

Because of Sassamon's intelligence and ability to speak English, Eliot arranged for Sassamon to take classes at Harvard College in 1653. This was two years before the Society for the Propagation of the Gospel, in partnership with Harvard, founded a special "Indian College" there. Sassamon studied at Harvard for a year. He may have studied alongside young Puritan men such as Increase Mather, Samuel Bradstreet, and John Eliot, Jr.

Murder
In January 1675, Sassamon warned Josiah Winslow, the governor of the Plymouth Colony, about an impending Indian attack being planned by Metacomet (King Philip). The Puritans discounted his warning. Soon afterward, Sassamon was reported missing. On January 29, 1675, his body was discovered in Assawompset Pond. At first, the Puritans thought that he had drowned by accident while fishing. However, further examination suggested that he was murdered because his neck was broken, most likely from a violent twisting. Additional evidence came from the Christian convert Patuckson, who testified to having seen three of Metacomet's men kill Sassamon and put him in the icy pond.

In June 1675, the Massachusetts General Court charged and tried three Wampanoag Indians for the murder of Sassamon: Tobias, Wampapaquan, and Mattashunnamo. This trial was the first in Plymouth to include a mixed jury. The jury consisted of twelve colonists and six Indian elders. The jury found the three men guilty of murdering Sassamon, and they were sentenced to death and executed.

Historians have proposed various reasons for why the Wampanoags would have murdered Sassamon. Possible reasons include revenge for his having told the colonists about war plans or disapproval of his conversion and efforts to evangelize to other natives. Behind the varying explanations, as the historian Jill Lepore writes, is Sassamon's position as "cultural mediator", a man who was considered "neither English nor Indian, but negotiated with both peoples."

Aftermath
Following the trial, tensions between both sides increased as they were becoming increasingly distrustful and frustrated with one another. The Puritans became more concerned about Metacomet's aggression and military strategies. The Wampanoags, who maintained the innocence of their three men, were outraged that the Puritans had prosecuted them. Metacomet in particular did not trust the colonists when it came to legal decisions concerning the Indians.

Even before the verdict was given, both the Massachusetts Bay Colony and Metacomet's tribe were mobilizing their forces for war. Fighting broke out later in June when the Wampanoags began attacking colonists in the Plymouth town of Swansea.

Significance
As a Massachusett who could both speak and write English, Sassamon had a unique role in 17th-century New England society. He had close relations with both Puritans and Indians and was considered elite in both societies. He was powerful in each settlement, where his position as a teacher was highly valued. To the Puritans, Sassamon had embodied the success of their conversion efforts and assimilation of Indians into colonial society. The Wampanoags relied on him as a crucial link between themselves and the Puritans. Ultimately, he came to embody the fundamental discord between the Wampanoags and the Puritans. His position outside each society represented the underlying irreconcilable differences and distrust between the two.

References

Bibliography
 Drake, James D. King Philip's War: Civil War in New England, 1675-1676. Amherst, Massachusetts: University of Massachusetts Press, 1999.
 Kawashima, Yasuhide. Igniting King Philip's War: The John Sassamon Murder Trial. Lawrence, Kansas: University Press of Kansas, 2001. 
 Leach, Douglas Edward. Flintlock and Tomahawk: New England in King Philip's War. The Norton Library. New York: Norton, 1966. 
 Lepore, Jill. "Dead Men Tell No Tales: John Sassamon and the Fatal Consequences of Literacy." American Quarterly Volume 46 Number 4 (1994): 479-512.
 Lepore, Jill. The Name of War: King Philip's War and the Origins of American Identity. 1st ed. New York: Knopf, 1998.
 Melvoin, Richard L. New England Outpost: War and Society in Colonial Deerfield. New York: Norton, 1989.
 Salisbury, Neal. "Introduction: A World Upended." In The Sovereignty and Goodness of God, 21. Boston, MA: Bedford/St. Martin's, 1997.
 Eliot's Journal

1600s births
1675 deaths
People of colonial Massachusetts
Harvard College alumni
Converts to Christianity from pagan religions
17th-century Native Americans
Native Americans connected with Plymouth Colony
Assassinated American people
Massachusett people
Native American history of Massachusetts
Native American people from Massachusetts
Translators of the Bible into indigenous languages of the Americas
17th-century translators